The Old theatre of Arad was a theatre in Arad, Austria-Hungary (now Romania). Founded in 1817, it was known as the first permanent theatre building in Romania, and played a pioneering role in the development of  professional theatre within the country. The theatre was closed in 1907 and transformed in to one of Romania’s first cinemas.

See also
  Théâtre des Variétés (Iași)

References

 Eugen Gluck/Alexandru Roz; Ghid de oraș Arad; 1982

1817 establishments in Romania
1907 disestablishments in Romania
1907 in Romania
Theatres in Romania